The Joseph Pierce Farm is an historic farm at 933 Gilbert Stuart Road in North Kingstown, Rhode Island. The oldest portion of the house, its southern ell, was originally built with a gable roof, but this was extended to the north in the late 18th or early 19th century, and given it present gambrel roof and Federal styling. Later additions in the 19th and 20th centuries gave the house its present cruciform appearance. Outbuildings dating to the 19th century include a barn with attached privy, a toolshed, and a henhouse. The complex is a well-preserved reminder of the area's rural heritage.

The farm was listed on the National Register of Historic Places in 1985.

See also
National Register of Historic Places listings in Washington County, Rhode Island

References

Houses in North Kingstown, Rhode Island
Houses on the National Register of Historic Places in Rhode Island
Farms in Washington County, Rhode Island
National Register of Historic Places in Washington County, Rhode Island